Electronic Music Laboratories, commonly abbreviated to EML, was a synthesizer company founded in 1968 in Vernon, Connecticut, by four engineers. It manufactured and designed a variety of synthesizers sharing the same basic design but configured in different ways.

The company originated by accident, after Dale Blake, Norman Millard, Dennis Daugherty, and Jeff Murray, employees of Gerber Scientific, founded the company in order to ensure that they all continued to have a job following an impending layoff. Following the schematics of a fellow audio engineer, Fred Locke, the four made synthesizers that directly competed with those of Moog Music and ARP. Although their synthesizers were not as sophisticated or capable as those designed by Bob Moog or Alan R. Pearlman, they were marketed as being much more reliable, which was true due to their use of op-amps instead of transistors.

The company's original EML-200 was designed in part for Connecticut's "Pilot Electronic Project" or "Project PEP" as an educational tool for secondary school students. The program was created by then State Music Consultant Lloyd Schmidt.

Although the company stopped manufacturing synthesizers in 1976, following the departure of two of their employees, the company continued to operate until 1984, designing and manufacturing products for others and repairing their synthesizers.

Products 

1969: The ElectroComp 200 - monophonic. a 2-VCO "expansion" module, similar to the SEM modules offered by Oberheim in 1974.
1970: The ElectroComp 100 - duophonic. a portable, "suitcase" synthesizer which was produced one year before the better known semi-modular ARP 2600.  The ElectroComp 100 was followed by the similar (and higher production) ElectroComp 101.
1972: The ElectroComp 101 - duophonic
 The ElectroComp 300 - a "controller" unit consists of a sequencer (with knobs & numeric keys), tiny synthesizer (without filter), and manual switches.
 The ElectroComp 400 Sequencer & 401 Synthesizer - another portable synthesizer with sophisticated sequencer. Commonly considered to be an imitation of ARP's Sequencer, but in fact, EML offered their sequencer before ARP's.
 The ElectroComp 500 - Followed a trend among musicians and manufacturers towards more portable, "performance" synthesizers. Was essentially a slimmed-down 101 with only 2 VCO's and sliders instead of patch points. Competed directly with the Minimoog and the ARP Odyssey, although it was more similar in design to the Odyssey than the Minimoog.
 The PolyBox - a small module designed to add polyphony to monophonic analog synthesizers. They came in black or orange and featured a 13-key keyboard. Only around 150 were made.
 The SynKey - one of EML's last products. Unique in its storage of patches on plastic punch-cards. Released in both programmable and non-programmable versions. EML also produced a few custom-built units which used their standard modules in new (usually larger) configurations,

Synthesizer modules were also available, giving musicians the ability to build their own modular synthesizers at a lower cost than a Moog, EMS, or ARP.

Notable Users
George Russell 
Jonn Serrie - Resident Synthesist at EML [Model 101 used on all 27 albums in release]
Devo - was used in "Whip It" to create the whip-like sound effects
Tommy Mars (in Frank Zappa's band)
The Moog Cookbook
Pere Ubu
Laurie Spiegel
Sylvester
Weezer - used extensively on the albums Pinkerton and Songs from the Black Hole
Razorblade Jones
Monolab
The Larry Mondello Band
Aphex Twin - the EML-400 was used in the making of Analord
J. Saul Kane (a.k.a. Depth Charge / The Octagon Man) - the EML-101 was pictured on the cover (and most likely also used) on The Octagon Man's Album "The Exciting World of..."
Sour Jazz - the EML-101 and 200 was used extensively on all studio albums
Al Greenwood on Foreigner's first 2 albums.
Pat Martino on Joyous Lake

Notes

Synthesizer manufacturing companies of the United States